Part of the BBC Computer Literacy Project, Electric Avenue was a late-night TV Series starting with an initial 10-episode series in 1988. The show followed Micro Live and was presented by Fred Harris.

Programmes
The first series was split into 10 programmes, each about 24 minutes long and dealing with a particular subject area. They were as follows (original air-dates in brackets):

The By-Product - (24 October 1988) 
The Machine - (31 October 1988)
Well Connected - (7 November 1988)
 What Next? - (14 November 1988)
New Directions - (28 November 1988)
Chips and Drumsticks - (5 December 1988)
Housewives Choice? - (12 December 1988)
Money Talks - (9 January 1989)
Safety First - (16 January 1989)
The Design Machine - (23 January 1989)

In 1990 a second series aired, with 5 further episodes:

 Computing the President - (15 January 1990)
 The Experts' Expert - (22 January 1990)
 Computers Can't Go Wrong, Can They? - (29 January 1990)
 Computers: A Cautionary Tale - (5 February 1990)
 Home Bleep Home - (12 February 1990)

References

External links

Electric Avenue on BBC Computer Literacy Project

Computer television series
1988 British television series debuts
1990 British television series endings
BBC Television shows
English-language television shows